The Lion The Witch & The Wardrobe is a ten-part serial adaptation of C. S. Lewis's 1950 fantasy novel The Lion, the Witch and the Wardrobe, which aired on ITV in 1967.

Background
The series was produced by Pamela Lonsdale and adapted for television by Trevor Preston.  Original music was provided by Paul Lewis and the programme, and the costumes, were designed by Neville Green.  The programme was made for the ITV network by ABC Weekend TV.  The animals were all portrayed by actors in costume, not unlike the later BBC adaptation.  Only two episodes, the first and eighth, are known to still survive today.

Main cast
 Zuleika Robson — Susan
 Liz Crowther — Lucy
 Jack Woolgar — Professor
 Paul Waller — Peter
 Edward McMurray — Edmund
 Elizabeth Wallace — The White Witch
 George Claydon — Ginarrbrik
 Susan Field — Mrs. Beaver
 Jimmy Gardner — Mr. Beaver
 Bernard Kay — Aslan
 Robert Booth — Maugrim
 Angus Lennie — Mr. Tumnus

Notes

External links

TV 1967
1960s British children's television series
1967 British television series debuts
1967 British television series endings
ITV children's television shows
Television shows produced by ABC Weekend TV
English-language television shows